This is a list of members of the Riksdag, elected in the 2022 Swedish general election, for the term 2022–2026. The opening of the new Riksdag session took place on 27 September 2022.

Composition

List of elected MPs

List of current MPs

Members who resigned and their successors

Substitutes
Below are substitutes who served for regular members.

Notes

References

Lists of members of the Riksdag by term
Sweden
2022-2026